Richard A. Snyder (March 26, 1910 – June 17, 1992) was an American politician from Pennsylvania who served as a Republican member of the Pennsylvania State Senate for the 13th district from 1961 to 1984.

Early life and education
Snyder was born in Lititz, Pennsylvania to Paris F. and Barbara (Ziegler) Snyder.

He graduated from Temple University Law School and worked as a staff writer for the Lancaster New Era newspaper from 1931 to 1942.

He served as a member of the United States Army Counter Intelligence Corps from 1942 to 1945.

Career
He served as a member of the Pennsylvania State Senate for the 13th district for six consecutive terms from 1962 to 1984.  He served on the Senate Appropriations Committee, Public Health and Welfare Committee, Education Committee and Labor and Education Committee.

He died on June 17, 1992 and is interred at the Donegal Presbyterian Church Cemetery in Mount Joy, Pennsylvania.

References

1910 births
1978 deaths
20th-century American politicians
United States Army personnel of World War II
Burials in Pennsylvania
Republican Party Pennsylvania state senators
People from Lititz, Pennsylvania
Temple University Beasley School of Law alumni